Langrishe is the surname of:
 Langrishe Baronets of Knocktopher Abbey, Kilkenny, Ireland
 Hercules Langrishe, 1st Baronet (1729–1811) politician
 Caroline Langrishe (b. 1958) English actress
 Jack Langrishe (1825–1895) Irish-born American actor and impresario
 May Langrishe (1864–1939), Irish tennis player, first Irish champion
 John Du Plessis Langrishe FRSE (1883–1947)

See also
 Langrishe, Go Down 1966 novel by Aidan Higgins